Debra ("Debbie") Lee Flintoff-King, (OAM) (born 20 April 1960) is a retired Australian athlete, and winner of the women's 400 m hurdles event at the 1988 Seoul Olympics.

Athletics career
Flintoff-King was born in Melbourne, the daughter of Richmond footballer Les Flintoff, and made her international debut at the 1982 Brisbane Commonwealth Games, winning the 400m hurdles in a Commonwealth record time of 55.89.

Flintoff finished sixth in the inaugural event at the 1984 Los Angeles Olympics. In 1986, after setting Australian records at both the 400m flat and 400m hurdles during the year, she won both events at the 1986 Edinburgh Commonwealth Games. Flintoff participated in Prince Edward's charity television special The Grand Knockout Tournament in 1987.

She then won a silver medal at the 1987 World Championships and became the first Australian athlete to win an IAAF Grand Prix Final in that year, taking out her specialty 400m Hurdles event.

She won a gold medal at the 1988 Seoul Olympics despite having just received news of her sister, Noeline's death. Her Olympic record time of 53.17 seconds is the current Australian record.

Flintoff-King was one of the bearers of the Olympic Torch at the opening ceremony of the 2000 Sydney Olympics.  She carried the Olympic Torch at the stadium, as one of the runners for the final segment, before the lighting of the Olympic Flame.

Married to her coach Phil King with three children (Amber King, Teisha King and Frazer King) Flintoff-King coached Australian sprinter Lauren Hewitt in the early 1990s and has mentored World Champion Jana Pittman.

Honours
In 1987, Flintoff-King received a Medal of the Order of Australia and was inducted into the Sport Australia Hall of Fame. She received an Australian Sports Medal in 2000.

References

External links
 
 
 
 
 
 
 

1960 births
Living people
Sportswomen from Victoria (Australia)
Athletes from Melbourne
Australian female hurdlers
Australian female sprinters
Olympic athletes of Australia
Olympic gold medalists for Australia
Athletes (track and field) at the 1984 Summer Olympics
Athletes (track and field) at the 1988 Summer Olympics
Medalists at the 1988 Summer Olympics
Commonwealth Games gold medallists for Australia
Commonwealth Games silver medallists for Australia
Commonwealth Games medallists in athletics
Athletes (track and field) at the 1982 Commonwealth Games
Athletes (track and field) at the 1986 Commonwealth Games
Athletes (track and field) at the 1990 Commonwealth Games
World Athletics Championships athletes for Australia
World Athletics Championships medalists
Recipients of the Medal of the Order of Australia
Recipients of the Australian Sports Medal
Sport Australia Hall of Fame inductees
Olympic gold medalists in athletics (track and field)
Medallists at the 1982 Commonwealth Games
Medallists at the 1986 Commonwealth Games
Medallists at the 1990 Commonwealth Games